Harold Neufeld (born October 10, 1927, in Altona, Manitoba) is a politician in Manitoba, Canada.  He was a member of the Legislative Assembly of Manitoba from 1988 to 1993, and a cabinet minister in the government of Gary Filmon from 1988 to 1992.

Neufeld began a public practice as a Chartered Accountant in 1954, and was a member of the Chartered Accountants of Manitoba.

He first ran for the Manitoba legislature in the 1986 provincial election as a Progressive Conservative, losing to incumbent New Democrat Vic Schroeder by 527 votes in the north-end Winnipeg riding of Rossmere.  In the 1988 election, with NDP support falling throughout the province, he was able to defeat Schroeder by 526 votes in a rematch.

Neufeld was appointed Minister of Energy and Mines with responsibility for the Manitoba Hydro Act and Seniors on May 9, 1988.  He was relieved of the latter responsibility on April 21, 1989.  He was re-elected by an increased margin in the 1990 provincial election.

Neufeld stepped down from his cabinet position on January 14, 1992, and resigned from the legislature on May 12, 1993.  There are suggestions that Neufeld resigned as a matter of principle, disturbed by the dubious methods used by the Filmon government to conceal its deficit spending.

A lifelong Mennonite, Neufeld joined the executive of Menno Simons College and became chair of the Menno Simons College Foundation after his retirement from the legislature.

References

Neufeld, Harold
Neufeld, Harold
Neufeld, Harold
Neufeld
Neufeld
Members of the Executive Council of Manitoba